Werewolf: The Wild West is a tabletop role-playing game in the World of Darkness series, published by White Wolf Publishing on May 30, 1997. It is a spin-off from their 1992 game Werewolf: The Apocalypse, and is set in the Wild West in the 19th century. Players take the roles of werewolves, warring to defending the Pure Lands (the Americas) from corruption in the form of the mighty Bane called the Storm-Eater.

Overview
Werewolf: The Wild West is a tabletop role-playing game in the Weird West genre, where players take the roles of werewolves of various tribes and battle both internally and against the Bane spirit the Storm-Eater's minions. The game uses the Storyteller System.

Production
Werewolf: The Wild West was designed by Justin Achilli and Ethan Skemp, and was conceived as a "savage West" interpretation of the earlier World of Darkness game Werewolf: The Apocalypse, following publisher White Wolf Publishing's model of historical role-playing games based on previous games in the series; the other two were Vampire: The Dark Ages (1996) and Mage: The Sorcerers Crusade (1998). Out of these, only Vampire: The Dark Ages performed well commercially, and so Werewolf: The Wild West was moved to White Wolf Publishing's lower-budget imprint Arthaus in 1998, but it still remained commercially unsuccessful. In 2014, Onyx Path Publishing released Wyld West Expansion Pack, which ports the game to the 20th Anniversary Edition of Werewolf: The Apocalypse.

Books

Reception and legacy

Backstab recommended the game for players new to the series, but thought it did not bring enough originality for players who had previously played Werewolf: The Apocalypse.

Retrospectively, Achilli considered it a mistake to have tried to cover as big of a time period as they had in Werewolf: The Wild West. This influenced the development of the 2002 game Victorian Age: Vampire, which rather than taking place across the entirety of the Victorian era was limited to 1880–1897.

Related media
A deck of Werewolf: The Wild West poker cards was released simultaneously with the game on May 30, 1997. Laws of the Wyld West, a live-action role-playing game adaptation for White Wolf Publishing's game Mind's Eye Theatre, was released in 1999.

References

Further reading

Werewolf: The Apocalypse
Role-playing games introduced in 1997
Horror role-playing games
Multigenre Western role-playing games